In metadata, an indicator is a Boolean value that may contain only the values true or false.  The definition of an Indicator must include the meaning of a true value and should also include the meaning if the value is false.

If a data element may take another value to represent e.g. unknown or not applicable, then a Code should be used instead of an Indicator, and the meanings of all possible values should be clearly defined.

The suffix Indicator is used in ISO/IEC 11179 metadata registry standard as a representation term.

Example of Use of Indicator in XML
An example use of the Indicator suffix is if an XML document was required to contain the passing status of a Student in a statewide assessment.  The data element would be:

Standards that use the indicator representation term
The following metadata registry standards use the term indicator
 ebXML
 NIEM
 GJXDM

See also
 Metadata
 ISO/IEC 11179
 Representation term
 Code

References 
https://web.archive.org/web/20110927233605/https://www.niem.gov/documentsdb/Documents/Technical/NIEM-NDR-1-3.pdf page 65

Metadata
Representation term